
This is a list of players who graduated from the Web.com Tour Finals in 2013. The top 25 players on the Web.com Tour's regular season money list in 2013 earned their PGA Tour card for 2014. The Web.com Tour Finals determined the other 25 players to earn their PGA Tour cards and the priority order of all 50.

2013 Web.com Tour Finals

*: PGA Tour rookie in 2014
†: First-time PGA Tour member in 2014, but ineligible for rookie status due to having played eight or more Tour events in a previous season
 Earned spot in Finals through PGA Tour.
 Indicates whether the player earned his card through the regular season or through the Finals.

Results on 2013–14 PGA Tour

*: PGA Tour rookie in 2014
†: First-time PGA Tour member in 2014, but ineligible for rookie status due to having played eight or more Tour events in a previous season
 Retained his PGA Tour card for 2015: won or finished in the top 125 of the money list or FedEx Cup points list.
 Retained PGA Tour conditional status and qualified for the Web.com Tour Finals: finished between 126–150 on FedEx Cup list and qualified for Web.com Tour Finals.
 Failed to retain his PGA Tour card for 2015 but qualified for the Web.com Tour Finals: finished between 150–200 on FedEx Cup list.
 Failed to retain his PGA Tour card for 2015 and to qualify for the Web.com Tour Finals: finished outside the top 200 on FedEx Cup list.

Heath Slocum, Bud Cauley, Tyrone van Aswegen, Hudson Swafford, Chad Collins, Sean O'Hair, John Peterson, Jim Herman, and Alex Prugh all regained their cards through the 2014 Web.com Tour Finals; Prugh qualified for the Finals by finishing 36th on the Web.com Tour regular season money list.

Winners on the PGA Tour in 2014

Runners-up on the PGA Tour in 2014

References

External links
Web.com Tour official site

Korn Ferry Tour
PGA Tour
Web.com Tour Finals graduates
Web.com Tour Finals graduates